The National Association of Seadogs, popularly known as the Pyrates Confraternity, is a confraternity organization in Nigeria that is nominally University-based. The group was founded in 1952 by the "Magnificent Seven" to support for human rights and social justice in Nigeria.

History

Due to the increase of tribalism among social life of students and the increasing population of "wealthy" students to a relatively few "poorer" students in the University College, Ibadan, the National Association of Seadogs was formed as a body in order to combat these societal ills. Founded in 1952 by seven friends made up of renowned Nobel Prize in Literature laureate Wole Soyinka, Ralph Opara, Pius Oleghe, Ikpehare Aig-Imoukhuede (left), Nathaniel Oyelola, Olumuyiwa Awe and Sylvanus U. Egbuche who adopted the name "Magnificent 7", the Pyrates Confraternity went on to become the only confraternity on Nigerian campuses for almost 20 years. Membership into the confraternity was open to students who were bright academically regardless of their tribe or religion.

Presently, the Pyrates confraternity is located in all the southern states in Nigeria and also has branches in some parts of the world including the United Kingdom, Republic of Ireland, South Africa, the Netherlands, Japan, Australia, Canada and the United States. Some sinister confraternities have been formed to copy the Pyrates confraternity which led the Pyrates confraternity to dissociate itself from these organizations and also operate outside university campuses.

The confraternity is also presently seen as a "political opponent" after several members in Port Harcourt were detained in jail for participating in the disruption of election campaigns in 1997. To date, over 25,000 people have belonged to the organization at various stages.

Signs and symbols
The Pyrates Confraternity was registered with the Nigerian Federal Ministry of Internal Affairs under the Land (Perpetual Succession) Act Cap 98 with the name "The National Association of Seadogs".

Skull and Bones

The Skull and Bones is the choice logo of the Pyrates confraternity made by the Magnificent 7. Colored in red, black and yellow; the logo consists of a human skull and two cross bones thus injecting the perception of seeing its members as men of danger. Members are known as "Seadogs" and "Saylors".

Brief sayings
There are brief sayings and slang associated with the organization as a sign of respect or greeting. These saying include: Odas is Odas, No Friend No Foe, Absolutely No Lagging, etc.
nas nas

See also
 Confraternities in Nigeria

References

Further reading
 
 
 

Confraternities in Nigeria
Student organizations established in 1952
1952 establishments in Nigeria
Student societies in Nigeria